More New Arabian Nights: The Dynamiter (1885) is a collection of linked short stories by Robert Louis Stevenson and Fanny van de Grift Stevenson.

Contents
"Prologue of the Cigar Divan"
"Challoner's adventure: The Squire of Dames"
"Story of the Destroying Angel"
"The Squire of Dames (Concluded)"
"Somerset's adventure: The Superfluous Mansion"
"Narrative of the Spirited Old Lady"
"The Superfluous Mansion (Continued)"
"Zero's Tale of the Explosive Bomb"
"The Superfluous Mansion (Continued)"
"Desborough's Adventure: The Brown Box"
"Story of the Fair Cuban"
"The Brown Box (Concluded)"
"The Superfluous Mansion (Concluded)"
"Epilogue of the Cigar Divan"

External links
 Deciphering The Dynamiter: A Study in Authorship Attribution

 Digitised copy of More New Arabian Nights: The Dynamiter from the Longmans, Green & Co edition (1885) from National Library of Scotland. JPEG, PDF, XML versions.
 

1885 short story collections
Mormonism in fiction
Short story collections by Robert Louis Stevenson